Thomas Soar (3 September 1865 – 17 May 1939) was an English first-class cricketer. Soar was a right-handed batsman who bowled right-arm fast.

Soar made his debut for Hampshire in 1888. The club by this time had lost their first-class status, meaning Soar's debut match for the county against the Marylebone Cricket Club was a non first-class fixture. Soar continued to represent Hampshire in non first-class matches until Hampshire were re-elevated to first-class status and included in the 1895 County Championship.

Thus Soar made his first-class debut for Hampshire in the 1895 County Championship against Somerset. Soar represented Hampshire in 101 first-class matches 1895 to 1904. Soar's final appearance for the county came in the 1904 County Championship against Yorkshire at the United Services Recreation Ground in Portsmouth.

In his 101 matches for the county, Soar scored 1,927 runs at a batting average of 13.38, with 5 half centuries and a high score of 95 against Somerset in 1899. Soar was a consistent bowler taking 323 wickets for the county at a bowling average of 23.82, with 23 five wicket hauls and 7 ten wicket hauls in a match, with best bowling figures of 8/38 against Essex in 1896. Soar's debut season was his best with the ball, during which he took 95 wickets at an average of 17.95, with 8 five wicket hauls, 4 ten wicket hauls in a match and best figures of 7/49. Soar could be described as a bowling all-rounder. In addition Soar took 49 catches in the field.

In 1908 Soar made his debut for Carmarthenshire in a Minor Counties Championship match against fellow Welsh county Monmouthshire. Soar made 6 Minor Counties appearances for Carmarthenshire, with his final match for the county coming in 1911 against Berkshire in what was to be Carmarthenshire's final season as a Minor County.

Soar died at Llandovery, Carmarthenshire on 17 May 1939.

External links
Thomas Soar at Cricinfo
Thomas Soar at CricketArchive
Matches and detailed statistics for Thomas Soar

1865 births
1939 deaths
Cricketers from Nottingham
People from Nottingham (district)
Cricketers from Nottinghamshire
English cricketers
Hampshire cricketers
Carmarthenshire cricketers